Warren Errol Truss,  (born 8 October 1948) is a former Australian politician who served as the 16th Deputy Prime Minister of Australia and Minister for Infrastructure and Regional Development in the Abbott Government and the Turnbull Government. Truss served as the federal leader of the National Party of Australia (The Nationals) between 2007 and 11 February 2016 when he announced his decision to retire and not contest the 2016 federal election. He was the member of the House of Representatives for Wide Bay from the 1990 election until his retirement in May 2016. Following the merger of the Queensland branches of the Nationals and Liberals, Truss was re-elected in 2010 for the Liberal National Party.

Early life
Truss was born in the region of Kingaroy, Queensland. He attended Concordia Lutheran College in Toowoomba. He was a bean farmer before he entered politics. He was chair of the Sugar Coast Burnett Regional Tourism Board and a councillor of the Shire of Kingaroy 1976–90. He was Chairman of Kingaroy Shire Council from 1983 to 1990.

Political career
Truss's first attempt at a parliamentary seat was in the Queensland state parliament as the Nationals candidate at the 1988 Barambah by-election, triggered by the retirement of former premier Joh Bjelke-Petersen. However, Truss lost in an upset to the Citizens Electoral Council candidate Trevor Perrett, who later joined the National Party.

Parliament
Truss was elected to the safe National seat of Wide Bay at the 1990 election. He was a member of the Opposition Shadow Ministry 1994–96.

With the Liberal/National Coalition defeating the Australian Labor Party at the 1996 election, Truss was appointed Deputy Leader of the House 1997–98, Minister for Customs and Consumer Affairs 1997–98, and Minister for Community Services 1998–99. He was promoted to the John Howard cabinet and served as Minister for Agriculture, Fisheries and Forestry 1999–2005.

Nationals leadership
In June 2005 John Anderson announced his intention to resign as National Party Leader. Deputy Leader Mark Vaile was elected the new Leader, and Truss was elected Deputy Leader. In the reshuffled ministry following Anderson's resignation Truss became Minister for Transport and Regional Services.

In 2006, following the AWB oil for food scandal, Truss and Vaile swapped portfolios, with Truss becoming Minister for Trade and Vaile taking the Transport and Regional Services portfolio until the defeat of the Liberal/National Coalition government at the 2007 election.

After the election, Mark Vaile resigned as National Party Leader, citing the party's need for "generational renewal". With some reluctance, Truss nominated for the leadership, and was elected as federal leader of the Nationals on 3 December 2007.

In 2008, Coalition leader Malcolm Turnbull appointed Truss as Shadow Minister for Trade, Transport, Regional Development and Local Government. He retained that portfolio after Tony Abbott became Coalition leader in late 2009. Following the 2010 election, Truss became Shadow Minister for Infrastructure and Transport. At this election, Truss was elected for the Liberal National Party, which had been formed from the 2009 merger of the two non-Labor parties' Queensland branches. However, he continued to sit as a National, and remained the Nationals' federal leader.

Deputy Prime Minister

Truss retained his seat in the 2013 Federal election, in which the Coalition was elected to a strong majority government.  On 18 September, Truss was sworn in as Deputy Prime Minister, per a longstanding agreement between the Liberals and Nationals.  The leader of the Nationals has ranked second in all but two non-Labor governments since the Coalition was first formed in 1923.

Truss remained Deputy Prime Minister after Turnbull deposed Abbott in a 2015 leadership spill. On 11 February 2016 Truss announced his decision to retire from politics at the 2016 federal election and immediately resigned as Nationals leader and Deputy Prime Minister. Barnaby Joyce was elected as leader and was sworn as the Deputy Prime Minister. Truss also resigned from cabinet and returned to the backbench.

Truss's leadership of the Nationals was considered steady, albeit rarely visible. Despite being the number-two man in the government, Truss was relatively unknown; only one in five Australians were familiar with him. He lifted the party's representation in the House of Representatives from ten seats in 2007 to 15 seats in 2013.

Honours and awards

On 1 January 2001, Truss was awarded the Centenary Medal for "service as Minister for Agriculture, Fisheries and Forestry".

In 2014, the South Burnett Regional Council named their Kingaroy Chambers the "Warren Truss Chamber" in recognition of Truss's time as Mayor of the former Kingaroy Shire.

Truss was appointed a Companion of the Order of Australia in the 2019 Australia Day Honours for "eminent service to the Parliament of Australia, particularly in the areas of trade, transport, agriculture, and rural and regional development".

References

External links

 Warren Truss official website
 Electoral Division of Wide Bay (Qld) The Hon Warren Truss MP
 Warren Truss maiden speech 15 May 1990 Hansard p522
 Lost (TV Series 2004–2010) - IMDb

|-

|-

|-

|-

|-

|-

 
|-

|-

|-

1948 births
20th-century Australian politicians
21st-century Australian politicians
Abbott Government
Australian monarchists
Companions of the Order of Australia
Deputy Prime Ministers of Australia
Government ministers of Australia
Leaders of the National Party of Australia
Liberal National Party of Queensland members of the Parliament of Australia
Living people
Members of the Australian House of Representatives for Wide Bay
Members of the Cabinet of Australia
National Party of Australia members of the Parliament of Australia
People from Kingaroy
People from Maryborough, Queensland
Recipients of the Centenary Medal
Turnbull Government